Solarisbank is a Berlin-based fintech company that offers a banking-as-a-service platform with its German banking license.

Background

Overview 
Solarisbank was established in 2015 as a part of Finleap, a fintech company builder based in Berlin, Germany, with Andreas Bittner and Marko Wenthin as its founders. Solarisbank was officially launched in March 2016, after receiving its banking license.

In October 2016, the company entered into a strategic partnership with MasterCard in order to develop novel banking modules.

In February 2017, Solarisbank raised €26.3 million in its series A funding round from Yabeo Capital, Arvato Financial Solutions, FinLeap, Unicredit and the Japan-based SBI group. The company also brought in Dr. Roland Folz as CEO.

In March 2017, Solarisbank is said to have brought over 20 companies onto its banking platform and it is reported to have passported its banking license to six European countries.

In March 2018, Solarisbank raised $70 million in Series B funding from Arvato Financial Solutions, SBI Group, BBVA, Visa, Lakestar and ABN AMRO's Digital Impact Fund.

In June 2020, Solarisbank raised €60 million in Series C funding led by HV Holtzbrinck Ventures with participation from Vulcan Capital, Samsung Catalyst Fund and Storm Ventures.

Technology 
Solarisbank provides a banking platform, which is said to allow its users, mostly digital companies and financial services startups, to access various banking service modules, which then can be integrated into their processes, websites or mobile applications.

Special audit 
In January 2022, the Federal Financial Supervisory Authority (BaFin) of Germany ordered a special audit because of organizational deficiencies identified during a bank supervisory audit from 2020. The independent external auditors are supposed to verify whether Solarisbank has implemented the respective measures which were agreed with BaFin as a result of the Art. 44 KWG standard audit. Folz publicly welcomed this action, claiming that the company held no secrets.

Awards and recognition 
Solarisbank was one of the finalists for the "Most Disruptive Innovation" Award at the 2016 Global Banking Awards, held in Spain.

References 

Financial technology companies
Banks established in 2016
Companies based in Berlin
2016 establishments in Germany

External links
 Official website